Busy-Bee was a Chicago-based record label founded in 1904 that sold both cylinders and discs, often (but not always) with content licensed from other labels. Their cylinders could only be played on special Busy-Bee players. A 1906 cylinder catalog shows artists including Gilmore's Band, Billy Murray, Arthur Collins, Bob Roberts, and Ada Jones.

History
Busy Bee was founded in April 1904 in Chicago by Arthur James O'Neill (1868–1916), Winifred B. James, and Sherwin Nelson Bisbee (1862–1924). The label is the namesake of Sherwin Nelson Bisbee (1862–1924), a banker, born in Prairie du Chien, Wisconsin, who, at the time, was General Sales Manager for O'Neill-James Company. All of its cylinders had Columbia matrix numbers.

Bibliography

Notes

References

 Sutton is the owner of Mainspring Press, LLC. The data was compiled by Bryant.

 

 

 

  ; ; .
 
 
 

 

 Note: Prescott was responding to a contributor of a May 1929 article, "Adventures in Collecting," by Oman. Prescott, a recording pioneer on various levels, had been affiliated with International Zonophone Company, which incorporated in Jersey City March, 7, 1901. His brother, Frederick Marion Prescott (1869–1923) became Managing Director and J.O., himself, was one of the shareholders.

 

Defunct record labels of the United States
Cylinder record producers